These communities in the United Kingdom contain significant Orthodox Jewish populations.

In London
Barnet
Edgware
Gants Hill
Golders Green
Golders Green Beth Hamedrash
Hendon
Mill Hill
St John's Wood
South Tottenham
Stamford Hill
Woodside Park

Outside London
Broughton, Greater Manchester
Edgbaston
Gateshead
Sedgley Park

United Kingdom
Orthodox Judaism in the United Kingdom
Jews and Judaism in England
Orthodox Judaism in London